Paul Gavin Breedon Fisher (born 17 May 1977) is an English cricketer.  Fisher is a right-handed batsman who bowls slow left-arm orthodox.  He was born in Leicester, Leicestershire.

Fisher represented the Leicestershire Cricket Board in 3 List A matches.  These came against Hertfordshire in the 1999 NatWest Trophy, the Durham Cricket Board in the 2000 NatWest Trophy and the Warwickshire Cricket Board in the 2001 Cheltenham & Gloucester Trophy.

In his 3 List A matches, he scored a single run, took 2 catches and took a single wicket at a bowling average of 124.00, with best figures of 1/18.

He currently plays club cricket for Loughborough Town Cricket Club in the Leicestershire Premier Cricket League.

References

External links
Paul Fisher at Cricinfo
Paul Fisher at CricketArchive

1977 births
Living people
Cricketers from Leicester
English cricketers
Leicestershire Cricket Board cricketers